Ebrahim is the ninth official studio album by Iranian singer Mohsen Chavoshi. Chavoshi released To Dar Masafate Barani... and Ma Bozorgo Naadanim... online and without proper permissions from Ministry of Culture and Islamic Guidance but soon they got removed from Chavoshi's official Telegram channel and Beeptunes. The songs are available on the VIP edition of the album which includes Mohsen Chavoshi's autograph on its back cover and Hossein Safaa's poetry book, titled Catapult, with his autograph on the first page.

Track listing

Personnel 
Musicians

 Mohsen Chavoshi - vocals, keyboard
 Adel Rouhnavaz - electric guitar
 Tohid Noori - piano
 Meisam Marvasti - violin, setar

Production

 Hadi Hosseini - producer
 Mohsen Chavoshi - arrangement (except those noted)
 Shahaab Akbari - arrangement (In the Distance of the Rain and Corrupt World...)
 Farshaad Hesami - arrangement (Please Tell... and Hey Month of Mehr)
 Mehdi Moezi - administration manager
 Abolfazl Afshari - coordination manager
 Mohsen Asgari - graphic designer

References

External links
 Mohsen Chavoshi Official Website

2018 albums
Mohsen Chavoshi albums